Mesquite is a common name for several small trees in the genus Prosopis native to North American deserts.

Mesquite may also refer to:

Biology
Mesquite lizard
Mesquite mouse
Mesquite (software), an open-source software program for evolutionary biology

Places in the United States
Mesquite, Nevada
Mesquite Airport
Mesquite, New Mexico
Mesquite, Texas, a suburb of Dallas
Mesquite, Borden County, Texas, a former town
Mesquite, Starr County, Texas
Mesquite Creek, Arizona
Mesquite Hills, California
Mesquite Mountains, California
Mesquite Solar project, Arizona

Other uses

Mesquite Bosque
Mesquite ProRodeo
Mesquite Kickers

See also
Mesquite High School (disambiguation)
Mezquita (disambiguation)